Bivesiculidae is a family of trematodes in the order Plagiorchiida.

Genera
Bivesicula Yamaguti, 1934
Bivesiculoides Yamaguti, 1938
Paucivitellosus Coil, Reid & Kuntz, 1965
Treptodemoides Shen & Qiu, 1995
Treptodemus Manter, 1961

References

Plagiorchiida
Trematode families